Denis Kudla was the defending champion but lost in the first round to Alexander Bublik.

Nuno Borges won the title after defeating Alexander Shevchenko 4–6, 6–2, 6–1 in the final.

Seeds

Draw

Finals

Top half

Bottom half

References

External links
Main draw
Qualifying draw

Arizona Tennis Classic - 1